To Love Ru is an anime series based on the manga of the same name written by Saki Hasemi and illustrated by Kentaro Yabuki. Produced by Xebec and directed by Takao Kato, the first season of the anime series aired in Japan between April 4 and September 26, 2008. While the first season uses characters and general themes from the original manga, a large majority of episodes in this season is anime original and did not adapt much from its source material manga.

The anime is licensed in North America by Sentai Filmworks and distributed by Section23 Films. The complete DVD collection part one containing the first half-season was released on December 15, 2009 and part two containing the second half-season was released on February 16, 2010. Sentai released the series on Blu-ray on March 18, 2014.


Episode list

References

External link
 

Season 1
2008 Japanese television seasons